The 1928 United States Senate election in Indiana took place on November 6, 1928. Incumbent Republican U.S. Senator Arthur Robinson, who had been appointed and elected to finish the unexpired term of Samuel Ralston, was re-elected to a full term in office.

General election

Candidates
Charles Ginsberg (Socialist Labor)
William F. Jackson (Workers)
Philip K. Reinbold (Socialist)
Arthur Raymond Robinson, incumbent Senator since 1925 (Republican)
Arthur L. Gilliom, Indiana Attorney General (Republican)
Albert Stump (Democratic)
John Zahnd (National)

Results

See also 
 1928 United States Senate elections

References

Indiana
1928
1928 Indiana elections